Jeon Hye-jin (born August 10, 1976) is a South Korean actress. She starred in Lee Joon-ik's historical drama The Throne (2015), for which she won a Blue Dragon Film Award for Best Supporting Actress.

Career
Jeon Hye-jin was 1997 Miss Korea's contestant from Gyeongnam. Jeon debuted as actress with minor roles in film , which was released in 1998. At that time she was a student who was studying directing in Sangmyung University. Jeon enjoyed watching movie, but never thought that she would be acting. Director Lee Sang-woo (artistic director of the theatre company Chaimu), who met her through this film, led her to the theater world. In 1998, Jeon took the stage of the theatre in earnest through the theatre company Chaimu. When she was active as a theater actress, she used the stage name Jeon Da. She later appeared in many works in the plays 'The Moral Thief', 'The Sogue', 'There', 'Unification Express', and 'Shape'. She was nicknamed Daehangno's Jun Ji-hyun.

She debuted in small screen in 2002 with minor role in Ruler of Your Own World. Two years later, Jeon appeared in KBS2 Monday-Tuesday drama I'm Sorry, I Love You and she played the role of Yoon Seo-gyeong, the sister of Cha Moo-hyeok (So Ji-sub).

In 2008, Jeon appeared as the female lead in the music video of 'Wonji' in the 5th album of Kim Kwang-jin's album, and captivated many with her innocent appearance.

Jeon starred as Consort Yeong in Lee Joon-ik's historical drama The Throne (2015), starring Song Kang-ho and Yoo Ah-in. She won a Blue Dragon Film Award for Best Supporting Actress. 

Jeon played Chun-bae, in crime-noir film The Beast, an informant who makes a risky proposal to detective Han-soo (Lee Sung-min).

Personal life
Jeon married her boyfriend of seven years, actor Lee Sun-kyun on May 23, 2009. Their agency announced that their first son was born on November 25, 2009. They had their second son on August 9, 2011.

Filmography

Film

Television series

Theater

Awards and nominations

References

External links

1972 births
Living people
South Korean television actresses
South Korean film actresses
South Korean stage actresses
Sangmyung University alumni
Miss Korea delegates